This is a list of commissions of inquiry in Queensland.

 Royal Commission on the management of the Woogaroo Lunatic Asylum and the Lunatic Reception Houses of the Colony (1877) 
Royal Commission into the Constitution, Administration and Working of the Criminal Investigation Branch of the Police Force of Queensland (1899)
 Royal Commission of Inquiry on Licensing and Liquor Laws (1901) 
Royal Commission into the Kedron Park Racecourse (1921)
 Royal Commission of Inquiry into Collinsville State Coal Mine (1923) 
Royal Commission on Racing and Racecourses (1930)
 Commission of Inquiry into the Escape of Certain Prisoners from HM Prison, Brisbane (1947) 
 Commission of Inquiry into the Sawmilling Industry, the Industry of the Manufacture of Plywood and the Industry of the Manufacture of Joinery in the State of Queensland (1949) 
Royal Commission into Allegations of Corruption relating to dealing with certain Crown Leaseholds in Queensland (1956)
 Commission of Inquiry into the Farm Home for Boys, Westbrook (1961) 
 Royal Commission Appointed to Inquire into and Report on Certain Matters Relating to Members of the Police Force and the National Hotel (1963) 
 Herberton Hospital Inquiry (1963) 
 Committee of Inquiry into Matters Concerning The Valuation of Lands In Queensland (1966) 
 Commission Of Inquiry Into Circumstances Surrounding Certain Matters Relating To Robert Andrew Somerville (1972) 
 Commission of Inquiry into the Status of Women in Queensland (1974) 
 Royal Commission of Inquiry into Drug Trafficking (1981)
 Fitzgerald Inquiry (1987–1989) 
 Parliamentary Judges Commission of Inquiry (1988–1989) 
 Commission of Inquiry into the Care and Treatment of Patients in the Psychiatric Unit of the Townsville General Hospital (1991) 
 Commission of Inquiry into Operation Trident (1993) 
 Forde Inquiry (1999) 
 Racing Industry Review Panel (2004) 
 Queensland Public Hospitals Commission of Inquiry (2005) 
 Queensland Fuel Subsidy Commission of Inquiry (2007) 
 Queensland Floods Commission of Inquiry (2011) 
 Queensland Child Protection Commission of Inquiry (2012–2013)
 Queensland Health Payroll System Commission of Inquiry (2013) 
 Queensland Racing Commission of Inquiry (2013–2014) 
 Queensland Organised Crime Commission of Inquiry (2015) 
Grantham Floods Commission of Inquiry (2015)
 Barrett Adolescent Centre Commission of Inquiry (2015–2016) 
Queensland Rail Train Crewing Practices Commission of Inquiry (2016–2017)

References

Queensland
Commissions of inquiry